Satish Chandra Mishra (born 9 November 1952) is an Indian politician who was the cabinet minister in Mayawati ministry in Uttar Pradesh, India, and a part of Bahujan Samaj Party (BSP). He is a lawyer by profession. He was a member of Rajya Sabha until 2 April 2022.

He is now the All India General Secretary of Bahujan Samaj Party.

Personal life
Satish Misra is son of Justice Tribeni Sahai Misra and Shakuntala Misra. He was born on 9 November 1952 in Kanpur, Uttar Pradesh. He did his Graduation & then LL.B. for Pandit Prithi Nath College and Allahabad University.

Career

Jan. 1998-Feb.1999 Chairman, Bar Council of Uttar Pradesh
May 2002 - Sept. 2003 Advocate General, Uttar Pradesh
Jan. 2004 onwards All India General Secretary, Bahujan Samaj Party (B.S.P.)
July 2004 Elected to Rajya Sabha
Aug. 2004 onwards Member, Committee on Home Affairs Member, Committee on Petroleum and Natural Gas Member, Business Advisory Committee
Sept. 2004 onwards Member, Committee on Members of Parliament Local Area Development Scheme (Rajya Sabha).
Oct. 2004 onwards Member, Consultative Committee for the Ministry of External Affairs.
Jan. 2006 onwards Member, Joint Parliamentary Committee on Wakf
June 2006 onwards Member, Parliamentary Forum on Youth
July 2010 Re-elected to Rajya Sabha (second term)
July 2016 Re-elected to Rajya Sabha (third term)

References

External links 
 Profile on Rajya Sabha website

Mr. Satish Chandra Mishra

Lens on Mayawati's brother for dubious deals{http://timesofindia.indiatimes.com/india/Lens-on-Mayawatis-brother-for-dubious-deals/articleshow/46914415.cms]

1952 births
Living people
Politicians from Lucknow
Bahujan Samaj Party politicians from Uttar Pradesh
People from Kanpur
State cabinet ministers of Uttar Pradesh
Mishra Satish Chandra
Advocates General for Indian states
Advocate General Uttar Pradesh
20th-century Indian lawyers